McGeahy Building is a historic commercial building located at Biltmore Village, Asheville, Buncombe County, North Carolina.  It was built in 1927, and is a two-story, brick building with a raised parapet.

It was listed on the National Register of Historic Places in 1979.

References

Commercial buildings on the National Register of Historic Places in North Carolina
Commercial buildings completed in 1927
Buildings and structures in Asheville, North Carolina
National Register of Historic Places in Buncombe County, North Carolina